Pentikäinen is a Finnish surname. Notable people with the surname include:

Atte Pentikäinen (born 1982), Finnish ice hockey player
Juha Pentikäinen (born 1940), Finnish professor of Religion

Finnish-language surnames